Women's Hospital was a 134-bed maternity and women's care hospital in Greensboro, North Carolina. It was North Carolina's first free-standing hospital dedicated to women.

In 1977, Humana opened Greensboro Hospital, the city's first for-profit hospital, with Charles Kuralt the keynote speaker for the dedication. The hospital's name changed to Humana Health-Greensboro in 1982, when 30 more beds were added. At the time, Humana opened its MedFirst clinics, which caused a number of doctors to leave in protest. Occupancy declined to the point the top floor was closed.

In 1985, a women's health unit opened but did not include obstetrics. Moses H. Cone Memorial Hospital took over in 1988 and returned the Greensboro Hospital name. After renovation, the hospital in 1990 became Women's Hospital of Greensboro, the state's first hospital for women and newborns.

After the birth of over 150,000 babies, it closed on February 23, 2020.  All services moved to the Cone Health Women's & Children's Center at Moses Cone Hospital. 

The hospital reopened in April serving only COVID-19 patients, with a capacity of 116. On March 3, 2021, the hospital discharged its last patient after serving 4,700 patients in all.

In a deal announced September 1, 2021, Cone Health traded the property to Deep River Partners in exchange for a lot on Green Valley Road, near where Cone Health had another facility. The pandemic had delayed Deep River's plans.

In January 2022, the building was torn down.

References

External links

Cone Health
Hospitals in Greensboro, North Carolina
Hospitals in North Carolina
Women's hospitals
Women in North Carolina